Jack "Jim" McGill (born c. 1927, date of death not found) was a Canadian football player who played for the Calgary Stampeders. He won the Grey Cup with them in 1948. He previously played junior football in Calgary with the East End Golden Arrows.

References

1920s births
Year of death missing
Canadian football tackles
Calgary Stampeders players